Erna Wachtel (April 3, 1907 – June 1, 1995) was an American artistic gymnast, coach and judge. Born in Germany, she immigrated to the United States at the age of 19. There she won multiple AAU titles, and in 1944 was named an Honorary Olympic Team member, for the games that were cancelled due to World War II. After retiring from competitions served as an AAU functionary, international referee, and national gymnastics coach, preparing the American women's gymnastics team to the 1956 Summer Olympics. From 1957 to 1973, she taught physical education at the Chicago Park District. In 1974 she was inducted into the U.S. Gymnastics Hall of Fame. Wachtel never married.

References

1907 births
1995 deaths
American female artistic gymnasts
20th-century American women
20th-century American people